Tephrochares is a monotypic moth genus of the family Noctuidae described by Zerny in 1955. Its only species, Tephrochares inquinata, was first described by Julius Lederer in 1857. It is found in Lebanon and Sicily.

References

Acontiinae
Monotypic moth genera